Andy Murray was the defending champion, but could not participate this year due to injury.

Lucas Pouille won the title, defeating Jo-Wilfried Tsonga in the final, 6–1, 6–4.

Seeds

Draw

Finals

Top half

Bottom half

Qualifying

Seeds

Qualifiers

Lucky loser

Qualifying draw

First qualifier

Second qualifier

Third qualifier

Fourth qualifier

References
 Main Draw
 Qualifying Draw

Erste Bank Open - Singles
2017 Singles
Erste Bank Open Singles